madamePee is a mobile female urinal, without contact and without water supply. It is designed to be used at public events such as concerts or music festivals, but also in more durable situations such as construction sites, public gardens, etc.

Context 
Female urination in public events is an ongoing issue (see section History in female urinal):  differences in needs, conventions and practices translate into a blatant inequality of access between men and women, with longer queues and waiting times for women. Since the beginning of the 20th century, many initiatives have been taken (see female urinal devices) to deal with this problem: including portable individual urinals, men-like urinals but adapted to the women morphology, unisex urinals, specific cabin urinals etc. However, who has attended outdoor rock concerts can attest that no standard and durable solution has been found and adopted.

Rationales 
Studies have shown that the separation of urination and defecation devices, such as for men, increases the efficiency of women's toilets, in terms of space optimization and service duration; for event planners, this means more devices, used more efficiently, with constant resources.

Implementation in public of female urinals has psychological and social implications, which strongly depend on the cultural environment. The degree of intimacy preservation is an important issue, viewed differently in unisex toilets or in cabin toilets.

Concept 
Nathalie des Isnards was so upset to miss the show of her favorite rock group, because of the time spent to access the toilets, that she contacted several designers, installation providers and psychologists to find an industrial solution. Building on the previous experiences, such as the contactless urination devices, madamePee is based on the following premises: 

 Mobility: devices should be easily installed and uninstalled;

 Environmental sustainability: no need for water supply (which adds to the mobility above) and urine collection for fertilizer uses;
 Privacy: to meet the needs of various countries and contexts, light cabins with hinged doors, possibly with a veil as roof.

Several patents have been taken, for example for the urinal itself which must not retain bad smells after use.   

MadamePee cabins have been installed in major public events for several years (e.g. Hellfest, Parisplages, Solidays...) ; they are distributed by major rental companies of mobile sanitary facilities.

Developments 
The COVID 19 pandemic halted the holding of outdoor festivals worldwide in the years 2019-2020, they were the first outlet for Madame Pee female urinals. Since the end of 2021, again, festivals have been organized bringing together hundreds of thousands of participants; MadamePee urinals were present at major events such as HellFest2022 (420,000 tickets sold) or Solidays in Paris.

The pandemic with restrictions on access to cafes and bistros has highlighted the need for public toilets for women in cities. Large cities in Western Europe are concerned with installing toilets in public places that are easy to maintain, without a water connection; about ten cities in France are experimenting with MadamePee urinals permanently installed in urban areas.

Climate change results in extreme drought in Western Europe in 2022, after several unusually dry summers; the use of drinking water in toilets is increasingly questioned and becomes a determining factor in the development of dry toilets (without connection to the drinking water network).

Finally, human urine as fertilizer is an alternative to the use of chemical fertilizers. Urine collection is not possible in general purpose toilets; MadamePee type urinals provide pure urine which is collected and transformed.

See also 

 Female urinals
 Female urination device
 Public toilets
 Pollee

References 

Toilets
Sanitation
Urinals
Feminine hygiene